Bhadsar  is a village development committee in Sarlahi District in the Janakpur Zone of south-eastern Nepal. At the time of the 1991 Nepal census it had a population of 2,950 people living in 499 individual households.

History 
This is an old village about 250 years old at a times of 19 century  .
There is an old temple of shiv as now (called Bangla) and also a kabristan (cemetery), the place of Muslim funerals.

Notable people From Bhadsar
 Salma Khatoon Mikrani

References

External links
UN map of the municipalities of Sarlahi  District

Populated places in Sarlahi District